Claire Yarlett (born February 15, 1965) is an English-born American actress, best known for her role as Bliss Colby in The Colbys, the spin-off series to the 1980s prime-time soap opera Dynasty. She also starred on the short-lived TV series Robin's Hoods.

Biography 
Yarlett, the daughter of cinematographer Anthony Yarlett, was later involved in an ill-fated 1988 attempt to revive the Charlie's Angels TV series.

Since then, Yarlett has been active on television, appearing in the daytime drama Days of Our Lives between 1990 and 1991 and making frequent guest appearances in shows such as Hercules: The Legendary Journeys, Renegade, ER, The West Wing, Becker, Frasier, and Lois and Clark.

References

External links
 

1965 births
Living people
American television actresses
Place of birth missing (living people)
American soap opera actresses
English emigrants to the United States
21st-century American women